Twister is a wooden roller coaster located at Knoebels Amusement Resort in Elysburg, Pennsylvania. It is a recreation of the famous Mister Twister, a 1964 John C. Allen design.

History 
Knoebels Amusement Resort in Elysburg, Pennsylvania, started planning another roller coaster in 1998, following the popularity of its first coaster, Phoenix. Seeking to preserve another classic ride, the park looked into acquiring the defunct "Mister Twister", which had been abandoned when the entire Elitch Gardens amusement park was relocated in Denver, Colorado. However, Mister Twister had been closed for so long that it was no longer in operating condition, and space constraints made physically relocating the ride impossible. Knoebels purchased the blueprints and set out to rebuild the roller coaster from scratch, modifying the design to fit the space available. A groundbreaking ceremony for the new Twister took place on November 3, 1998. At the time, the roller coaster was expected to cost $2 million to $3 million. Knoebels president Dick Knoebels described the ride as the largest project in the park's history.  

The ride was designed by Knoebels staff designer John Fetterman based on John Allen's original design for Mister Twister. Fetterman had never ridden Mister Twister himself, but one of his friends had recommended the ride after having gone on Mister Twister. Twister ultimately cost $3 million. The Adams Construction Company built the ride over a period of eight months. The roller coaster opened on July 24, 1999. An auction for seats on Twister's inaugural ride raised $8,625 for the Make-A-Wish Foundation.

Characteristics 
One cycle lasts about 2 minutes and 10 seconds. Throughout the course, the track crosses itself 36 times. The ride originally used 12-car trains, with two seats per car.

For the new Twister, Fetterman created a modified mirror image of the original "Mister Twister" layout, compacting the ride but preserving the highlights of the old design and Allen's original mathematical model. These highlights included the large double helix, which now wraps around the ride's curved station, and a large swoop curve at the top of the lift hill. To keep the swoop curve in the new design, Fetterman created a split lift hill. To achieve this, the train climbs halfway up the structure on one lift hill, makes a 180-degree turn and finishes the climb on the second lift, stacked directly above the first one. While several roller coasters use more than one lift hill in their layout, Twister's zig-zag lift is unique.

Ride experience
Once dispatched, the train drops out of the curved station, descends a slight left hand turn through the structure, then makes a sweeping right hand turn and hits the lower section of the lift hill, which is stacked underneath the second lift. After climbing halfway up, the track leaves the first lift hill, and makes a left turn out of the structure, then slams into a 180 degree turn passing under the exit from the double helix and climbs the upper section of the lift hill. At the top of the lift hill, the track passes through the swoop curve before diving down a 89.6-foot first drop, then rising up a second hill for the first turnaround. The train dives off the turnaround in its second drop, and rises into the double helix, which zooms twice around the station. After the helix, trains pass over a trimmed airtime hill and make a right turn inside the structure of the second hill. The train descends another drop, traveling within the structure, and traverses a banked right turn into an underground tunnel, the entrance into which is where the on-ride photo is quickly taken. Out of the tunnel, the track makes another unbanked right turn, then a small drop, before rising up and hitting the curved final brake run, before reentering the station. Because of the space limitations caused by fitting the station into the middle of the helix, the station track is curved, and both it and the brake run use skid brakes instead of pinch or magnetic brakes.

Image gallery

Statistics
Trains - 2 PTC, 24 passengers each
Design - 1964 original and 1965 modifications - John C. Allen; 1999 modifications - John Fetterman

References

Roller coasters introduced in 1999
Roller coasters in Pennsylvania